The 124th New York State Legislature, consisting of the New York State Senate and the New York State Assembly, met from January 2 to April 23, 1901, during the first year of Benjamin B. Odell, Jr.'s governorship, in Albany.

Background
Under the body of the New York Constitution of 1894, 50 Senators and 150 assemblymen were elected in single-seat districts; senators for a two-year term, assemblymen for a one-year term. The senatorial districts were made up of entire counties, except New York County (twelve districts), Kings County (seven districts), and Monroe County (two districts). The Assembly districts were made up of contiguous area, all within the same county.

At this time there were two major political parties: the Republican Party and the Democratic Party. The Prohibition Party, the Socialist Labor Party and the Social Democratic Party also nominated tickets.

Elections
The New York state election, 1900, was held on November 6. Gov. Theodore Roosevelt was elected U.S. vice president. Benjamin B. Odell, Jr. was elected Governor; and Lt. Gov. Timothy L. Woodruff was re-elected; both Republicans. The other five statewide elective offices up for election were also carried by the Republicans. The approximate party strength at this election, as expressed by the vote for Governor, was: Republicans 805,000; Democrats 694,000; Prohibition 23,000; Socialist Labor 14,000; and Social Democrats 13,000.

Sessions
The Legislature met for the regular session at the State Capitol in Albany on January 2, 1901, and adjourned on April 23.

S. Frederick Nixon (R) was re-elected Speaker, with 104 votes against 42 for Daniel D. Frisbie (D).

Timothy E. Ellsworth (R) was re-elected President pro tempore of the State Senate.

State Senate

Districts

Note: In 1897, New York County (the boroughs of Manhattan and Bronx), Kings County (the borough of Brooklyn), Richmond County (the borough of Staten Island) and the Western part of Queens County (the borough of Queens) were consolidated into the present-day City of New York. The Eastern part of Queens County (the non-consolidated part) was separated in 1899 as Nassau County. Parts of the 1st and 2nd Assembly districts of Westchester County were annexed by New York City in 1895, and became part of the Borough of the Bronx in 1898.

Senators
The asterisk (*) denotes members of the previous Legislature who continued in office as members of this Legislature. Patrick F. Trainor, Samuel S. Slater, James B. Ewan, Michael Russell and Henry W. Hill changed from the Assembly to the Senate.

Employees
 Clerk: James S. Whipple

State Assembly

Assemblymen

Employees
 Clerk: Archie E. Baxter
 Assistant Clerk: Ray B. Smith

Notes

Sources
 Official New York from Cleveland to Hughes by Charles Elliott Fitch (Hurd Publishing Co., New York and Buffalo, 1911, Vol. IV; see pg. 343f for assemblymen; and 364 for senators)
 CANDIDATES IN THE CITY in NYT on October 14, 1900
 PROCEEDINGS IN BOTH HOUSES in NYT on January 3, 1901
 VOTE ON REPEAL OF PIGEON SHOOTING LAW in NYT on May 7, 1901
 REPUBLICAN INCREASE IN THE ASSEMBLY; ...Republicans Elect ... Senators in the Thirtieth and Forty-third Districts to Fill Vacancies in NYT on November 6, 1901

124
1901 in New York (state)
1901 U.S. legislative sessions